The First Church of Christ, Unitarian, also known as First Church of Christ, Lancaster and colloquially as "the Bulfinch Church", is a historic congregation with its meeting house located at 725 Main Street facing the Common in Lancaster, Massachusetts. The church's fifth meeting house, built in 1816, was designed by architect Charles Bulfinch, and was designated a National Historic Landmark in 1977, recognizing it as one of Bulfinch's finest works.

History

First Church of Christ was "gathered in 1653 by the Puritans of Massachusetts Bay Colony." The town of Lancaster also dates from 1653. The current meeting house was built in 1816 of local brick and slate when Nathaniel Thayer was minister.

On December 30, 1970, the meeting house was added to the National Register of Historic Places and designated a National Historic Landmark. Architectural historian G. E. Kidder Smith has called it "one of the great federal style churches in the country."

In May 2010, the Church began a restoration of the meeting house cupola and facade supported by contributions from the Bulfinch Fund, a secular organization dedicated to restoring Bulfinch's works. Formerly a Congregational church, it is now Unitarian Universalist. Wil Darcangelo, M.Div, (also minister at the First Parish Unitarian Universalist Church of Fitchburg) is its current minister.

Architecture
The church is a rectangular structure with a projecting front section supporting a two-stage tower, and with an arcaded and pedimented portico at the very front. The portico consists of three high openings with round-arch tops, which frame three entry doors (the central one taller) behind. The arches are separated by pilasters, which rise to an entablature and a fully enclosed gable pediment. The pediment is lined by modillioned cornices, with plain brickwork in the tympanum. The sides of the portico are also arched and pilastered. The tower section, whose interior houses the vestibule area, rises the full width of the portico to the height of the gable peak, where there is a cornice line, above which rises the tower, flanked by carved wooden fan designs. The first stage of the tower is square, with clock faces adorning otherwise plain brick walls. Above a cornice is the second stage, a round section with a partially open belfry surrounded by twelve Ionic columns, which support an entablature and dentillated cornice. An attic section decorated with swag drapery rises above the belfry, and is topped by a round dome and weathervane.

See also
 First Church of Christ (disambiguation)
 List of National Historic Landmarks in Massachusetts
 National Register of Historic Places listings in Worcester County, Massachusetts

References

Further reading
 William H. Pierson Jr., American Buildings and Their Architects: The Colonial and Neoclassical Styles (Garden City, New York: Doubleday, 1970), pp. 270ff.

External links
 First Church of Christ Unitarian website
 National Historic Landmarks Program listing
 Bulfinch Fund website
 "Prim Grandeur, Elegant Geometries", John Wilmerding, The Wall Street Journal, 8 March 2013

1653 establishments in Massachusetts
National Historic Landmarks in Massachusetts
Churches completed in 1816
Unitarian Universalist churches in Massachusetts
Charles Bulfinch church buildings
Churches on the National Register of Historic Places in Massachusetts
Churches in Worcester County, Massachusetts
Buildings and structures in Lancaster, Massachusetts
National Register of Historic Places in Worcester County, Massachusetts
Historic district contributing properties in Massachusetts